The 1962 NCAA Golf Championship was the 24th annual NCAA-sanctioned golf tournament to determine the individual and team national champions of men's collegiate golf in the United States.

The tournament was held at the Duke Golf Club at Duke University in Durham, North Carolina.

Houston won the team title, the Cougars' sixth NCAA team national title and sixth in seven years.

Individual results

Individual champion
 Kermit Zarley, Houston

Tournament medalist
 Kermit Zarley, Houston (140)

Team results

Note: Top 10 only
DC = Defending champions

References

NCAA Men's Golf Championship
Golf in North Carolina
NCAA Golf Championship
NCAA Golf Championship
NCAA Golf Championship